Half a Life is a 1982 film directed by Romain Goupil, which won the Caméra d'Or and Award of the Youth (French film) at the Cannes Film Festival, and the César Award for Best Debut.

Plot 
The film is a biographical black-and-white documentary about Michel Recanati, a militant leader during the May 1968 riots in Paris.

It tells the story of two friends through the left-wing groups in Paris between 1966 and 1978 when Michel goes missing and it is later discovered that he committed suicide. It is a personal tale as well as an in-depth look at the political scene in France during those years. 
It also documents the history of the CAL  [Highschool Student Action Committee] and the LCR Revolutionary Communist League  .

Main protagonists 

Much of the original footage filmed over 10 years before the 1982 movie documentary was also filmed by Goupil. His father Pierre worked in the cinema and Romain armed with a super 8 camera took some footage of the student riots and meetings from that time in Paris.

There is footage of speeches by Alain Krivine a leader of the Trotskyist movement in France and a member of the Revolutionary Communist League known by the acronym LCR  Ligue Communiste Révolutionnaire  .

Other key figures of the French Left are interviewed at various points in the documentary. They include Trotskyst journalist Maurice Najman , also Henri Weber when he was a leading member of the Trotskyist Revolutionary Communist Youth known in French as: (JCR) Jeunesse communiste révolutionnaire and also a member of Revolutionary Communist League (LCR)

External links 

1982 films
French documentary films
1980s French-language films
1982 documentary films
May 1968 events in France
Best First Feature Film César Award winners
Caméra d'Or winners
1982 directorial debut films
1980s French films